Obava is a village located in the Mukacheve Raion (district) in the Zakarpattia Oblast (province) in western Ukraine.

It has a population of 990.

Villages in Mukachevo Raion